The Città di Caltanissetta is a professional tennis tournament played on outdoor red clay courts. It is currently part of the Association of Tennis Professionals (ATP) Challenger Tour. It is held annually in Caltanissetta, Italy, since 1999 (as a Satellite from 1999 to 2004, as a Futures from 2005 to 2008, as a Challenger since 2009).

Past finals

Singles

Doubles

External links
Official website
ITF search

 
ATP Challenger Tour
Clay court tennis tournaments
Caltanissetta
Tennis tournaments in Italy